"Chained" is a 1968 single released by soul singer Marvin Gaye. The song peaked at number 32 on the Billboard Top 100 on November 1, 1968.

Cash Box said that it has a "towering dance rhythm and a splendid vocal vector."

Chart history

References

1968 singles
Marvin Gaye songs
Songs written by Frank Wilson (musician)
1967 songs
Song recordings produced by Frank Wilson (musician)
Motown singles
Tamla Records singles